Macroglossum kitchingi is a moth of the family Sphingidae first described by Jean-Marie Cadiou in 1997. It comes from Sulawesi.

References

Macroglossum
Moths described in 1997